Christmas is an unincorporated community in Bolivar County, Mississippi, United States.

Christmas was historically located directly on the Mississippi River, on a section of the river called the "Beulah Bend" (now Lake Beulah).  The course of the river was artificially changed in 1863.

References

Unincorporated communities in Bolivar County, Mississippi
Unincorporated communities in Mississippi